PNM, or pnm, can refer to:

 Penitentiary of New Mexico, a US prison
 People's National Movement, a political party in Trinidad and Tobago
 Tobago Council of the People's National Movement
 PNM Resources. electricity and gas supplier, New Mexico, US
 pnm, the ISO 639-3 code for the Punan Batu language of Sarawak
 PNM, the National Rail code for Penmere railway station, Cornwall, UK
 Pop'n Music, a music video game series
 Portable anymap, graphics file formats
 Pure Nintendo Magazine

See also